SNX-482 is a toxin from the tarantula Hysterocrates gigas. It acts as a high-affinity blocker of R-type Ca2+ (Cav2.3) channels, but at higher concentrations it can also block other Ca2+ channels and Na+ channels.

Sources 

SNX-482 is isolated from the venom of the spider Hysterocrates gigas.

Sequence 

GVDKAGCRYMFGGCSVNDDCCPRLGCHSLFSYCAWDLTFSD-OH

Homology 

SNX-482 is homologous to the spider peptides grammatoxin S1A and hanatoxin.

Target 

Cav2.3 (alpha1E, R-type) channel (strong affinity), L-type Ca2+ channel, P/Q type Ca2+ channel, Na+ channel.

Mode of action 

The compound was initially identified as a selective, voltage-dependent inhibitor of Cav2.3 (a1E, R-type) channels. SNX-482 inhibits native R-type Ca2+ currents at weak nanomolar concentrations in rat neurohypophyseal nerve terminals. However, it does not influence R-type Ca2+ currents at concentrations of 200–500 nM in several types of rat central neurons. Washout could only moderately reverse the R-type Ca2+ channel inhibition after treatment with 200 nM SNX-482. However, application of strong voltage reverses the blocking of R-type Ca2+ channels. SNX-482 needs to interact with a1E domains III and IV to play a role in the significant inhibition of R-type channel gating. Although SNX-482 is generally viewed as a selective inhibitor of Cav2.3 (a1E, R-type) channels, more recently it was shown that it can also inhibit L-type or P/Q type Ca2+ channels and incompletely block Na+ channels.

Research and therapeutic use 

SNX-482 has been used to elucidate the roles of theaflavin-3-G in transmitter release.  Furthermore, some research has indicated that it inhibits neuronal responses in a neuropathic pain model, so it is possible that SNX-482 can be used to reduce dorsal horn neuronal pain in neuropathic pain therapy.

References

Ion channel toxins
Neurotoxins